is a Japanese football player. He currently plays for J2 League side Thespakusatsu Gunma.

Career statistics
Last update: 2 December 2018.

Reserves performance

References

External links
Profile at Avispa Fukuoka

1996 births
Living people
Association football people from Osaka Prefecture
Japanese footballers
J1 League players
J2 League players
J3 League players
Gamba Osaka players
Gamba Osaka U-23 players
Avispa Fukuoka players
FC Machida Zelvia players
J.League U-22 Selection players
Thespakusatsu Gunma players
People from Tondabayashi, Osaka
Association football forwards
Association football fullbacks